Fine Arts Commission may refer to:
 United States Commission of Fine Arts
 Royal Fine Art Commission (UK, 1922–99)
 Royal Fine Art Commission (1840s) on the decoration of the rebuilt Houses of Parliament
 Royal Fine Art Commission for Scotland
 Commission (art), the hiring and payment for the creation of a piece of art

See also
 Fine art